Steve Walter Tuttle (born January 5, 1966) is a Canadian former professional ice hockey forward who played for parts of three seasons (1988–1991) for the St. Louis Blues of the National Hockey League, scoring a total of 28 goals in his career. He was traded to the Tampa Bay Lightning, spending time with their International Hockey League affiliate, the Peoria Rivermen. In 1993, without playing a single game for the Lightning, he was traded to the Quebec Nordiques, playing for their IHL affiliate, the Milwaukee Admirals. He retired after the 1997–98 season.

Tuttle is most commonly remembered for being the player whose skate accidentally slashed the throat of Clint Malarchuk during a 1989 game against the Buffalo Sabres.

Career statistics

Awards and honours

References

External links

1966 births
Living people
Canadian ice hockey right wingers
Halifax Citadels players
Milwaukee Admirals players
Peoria Rivermen (IHL) players
Richmond Sockeyes players
St. Louis Blues draft picks
St. Louis Blues players
Ice hockey people from Vancouver
Wisconsin Badgers men's ice hockey players
AHCA Division I men's ice hockey All-Americans